The Judge Elisha Robinson House, in Ashville, Alabama, is a Queen Anne-style house built around 1890.  It was listed on the National Register of Historic Places in 1991.

It is located on U.S. Route 231 south of its junction with Alabama State Route 23.

It is a two-story house upon a brick pier foundation.

References

National Register of Historic Places in St. Clair County, Alabama
Queen Anne architecture in Alabama
Houses completed in 1890